Plantago rugelii is an edible species of flowering plant in the plantain family, Plantaginaceae. It is native to North America, where it occurs in eastern Canada and the central and eastern United States. Its common names include American plantain, blackseed plantain, pale plantain, and Rugel's plantain. The species name rugelii honors Ferdinand Ignatius Xavier Rugel (1806-1879), a German-born botanist and pharmacist.

This perennial herb grows from a taproot and fibrous root system. Extract from the roots of this plant have been shown to inhibit the hatching of nematodes.  It produces a basal rosette of wide oval leaves with longitudinal veining and a somewhat waxy texture. The base of the petiole may be reddish or purple. A scape bears clusters of whitish flowers. The fruit is a capsule about half a centimeter long containing several seeds. It splits down the middle. Plantago major is very similar, but it lacks the red tinge on the petioles and its leaves are darker and waxier.

Habitat
P. rugelii is commonly found in areas such as meadows, woodland borders, and stream banks

References

External links
 
 
 
 

rugelii
Flora of North America
Ruderal species
Plants described in 1852
Taxa named by Joseph Decaisne